Jung Eui-yoon (born July 25, 1986) is a South Korean professional baseball outfielder for the SSG Landers of the KBO League.

References

External links
 from the KBO League
 at SK Wyverns Baseball Club 

SSG Landers players
KBO League outfielders
South Korean baseball players
People from Busan
1986 births
Living people